Something to Live For: The Music of Billy Strayhorn is an album by Art Farmer recorded in New York in 1987 and originally released on the Contemporary label.

Reception

Scott Yanow of Allmusic said "This very logical set is a real gem... Farmer brings the right combination of sensitivity, swing, respect for the melody, and creativity to these renditions and the results are quite memorable".

Track listing
All compositions by Billy Strayhorn except as indicated
 "Isfahan" (Duke Ellington, Billy Strayhorn) - 7:25 
 "Blood Count" - 6:08  
 "Johnny Come Lately" - 5:39 
 "Something to Live For" (Ellington, Strayhorn) - 6:07
 "Upper Manhattan Medical Group" - 7:07   
 "Rain Check" - 6:44
 "Day Dream" (Ellington, Strayhorn, John La Touche) - 5:12 Bonus track on CD

Personnel
Art Farmer - flugelhorn, trumpet
Clifford Jordan - tenor saxophone
James Williams - piano
Rufus Reid - bass 
Marvin "Smitty" Smith - drums

References 

Contemporary Records albums
Art Farmer albums
1987 albums